The 2015–16 UEFA Champions League group stage began on 15 September and ended on 9 December 2015. A total of 32 teams competed in the group stage to decide the 16 places in the knockout phase of the 2015–16 UEFA Champions League.

Draw
The draw was held on 27 August 2015, 17:45 CEST, at the Grimaldi Forum in Monaco. The 32 teams were drawn into eight groups of four, with the restriction that teams from the same association could not be drawn against each other. For the draw, the teams were seeded into four pots based on the following principles (introduced starting this season):
Pot 1 contained the title holders and the champions of the top seven associations based on their 2014 UEFA country coefficients. As the title holders (Barcelona) were one of the champions of the top seven associations, the champions of the association ranked eighth were also seeded into Pot 1 (regulations Article 13.05).
Pots 2, 3 and 4 contained the remaining teams, seeded based on their 2015 UEFA club coefficients.

Moreover, the draw was controlled for teams from the same association in order to split the teams evenly into the two sets of groups (A–D, E–H) for maximum television coverage.

The fixtures were decided after the draw. On each matchday, four groups play their matches on Tuesday, while the other four groups play their matches on Wednesday, with the two sets of groups (A–D, E–H) alternating between each matchday. There are other restrictions: for example, teams from the same city (e.g., Real Madrid and Atlético Madrid, Chelsea and Arsenal, Manchester City and Manchester United) in general do not play at home on the same matchday (UEFA tries to avoid teams from the same city playing at home on the same day or on consecutive days, due to logistics and crowd control), and teams in certain countries (e.g., Belarus, Russia, Kazakhstan) do not play at home on the last matchday (due to cold weather and simultaneous kick-off times).

On 17 July 2014, the UEFA emergency panel ruled that Ukrainian and Russian clubs would not be drawn against each other "until further notice" due to the political unrest between the countries. Therefore, Ukrainian clubs Shakhtar Donetsk and Dynamo Kyiv (both Pot 3) and Russian clubs Zenit Saint Petersburg (Pot 1) and CSKA Moscow (Pot 3) could not be drawn into the same group.

Teams
Below are the 32 teams which qualified for the group stage (with their 2015 UEFA club coefficients), grouped by their seeding pot. They include 22 teams which enter in this stage, and the 10 winners of the play-off round (5 in Champions Route, 5 in League Route).

Notes

Format
In each group, teams played against each other home-and-away in a round-robin format. The group winners and runners-up advanced to the round of 16, while the third-placed teams entered the Europa League round of 32.

Tiebreakers
The teams are ranked according to points (3 points for a win, 1 point for a draw, 0 points for a loss). If two or more teams are equal on points on completion of the group matches, the following criteria are applied in the order given to determine the rankings (regulations Article 17.01):
higher number of points obtained in the group matches played among the teams in question;
superior goal difference from the group matches played among the teams in question;
higher number of goals scored in the group matches played among the teams in question;
higher number of goals scored away from home in the group matches played among the teams in question;
if, after having applied criteria 1 to 4, teams still have an equal ranking, criteria 1 to 4 are reapplied exclusively to the matches between the teams in question to determine their final rankings. If this procedure does not lead to a decision, criteria 6 to 12 apply;
superior goal difference in all group matches;
higher number of goals scored in all group matches;
higher number of away goals scored in all group matches;
higher number of wins in all group matches;
higher number of away wins in all group matches;
lower disciplinary points total based only on yellow and red cards received in all group matches (red card = 3 points, yellow card = 1 point, expulsion for two yellow cards in one match = 3 points);
higher club coefficient.

Groups
The matchdays are 15–16 September, 29–30 September, 20–21 October, 3–4 November, 24–25 November, and 8–9 December 2015. The match kickoff times are 20:45 CEST/CET, except for matchday 5 in Belarus and Russia and matchday 2 in Kazakhstan which are 18:00 CEST/CET, and matchdays 4 and 5 in Kazakhstan which are 16:00 CET.

Times are CET/CEST, as listed by UEFA (local times are in parentheses).

Group A

Notes

Group B

Group C

Group D

Group E

Group F

Group G

Notes

Group H

Notes

References

External links
2015–16 UEFA Champions League

Group Stage
2015-16